The second season of the American television series Star Trek: Picard features the character Jean-Luc Picard in the year 2401. He and his companions are trapped in an alternate reality by the extra-dimensional being Q as part of the ultimate trial for Picard, and must travel back to 2024 Los Angeles to save the future of the galaxy. The season was produced by CBS Studios in association with Secret Hideout, Weed Road Pictures, and Roddenberry Entertainment, with Akiva Goldsman and Terry Matalas serving as showrunners.

Patrick Stewart stars as Picard, reprising his role from the series Star Trek: The Next Generation as well as other Star Trek media. Alison Pill, Jeri Ryan, Michelle Hurd, Evan Evagora, Orla Brady, Isa Briones, Santiago Cabrera, and Brent Spiner also star. A second season was in development for months before being officially announced in January 2020. Matalas and Goldsman replaced first-season showrunner Michael Chabon. The time travel story was conceived by Matalas and connects to Picard's struggles with his own history. Matalas and new production designer Dave Blass returned to the visual style of the Next Generation and brought back key designers from that series. Delayed from a planned June 2020 production start by the COVID-19 pandemic, filming began in California in February 2021 and lasted until September, shooting back-to-back with the third season. Location shooting took place around Los Angeles. The second season features special guest stars returning from previous Star Trek media, including John de Lancie as Q and Whoopi Goldberg as Guinan.

The season premiered on the streaming service Paramount+ on March 3, 2022, and ran for 10 episodes until May 5. It was estimated to have high viewership and audience demand, and received positive reviews from critics. The season was nominated for four Primetime Emmy Awards and several other awards.

Episodes

Cast and characters

Main
 Patrick Stewart as Jean-Luc Picard
 Alison Pill as Agnes Jurati and the new Borg Queen
 Jeri Ryan as Seven of Nine
 Michelle Hurd as Raffi Musiker
 Evan Evagora as Elnor
 Orla Brady as Laris and Tallinn
 Isa Briones as Soji Asha and Kore Soong
 Santiago Cabrera as Chris Rios
 Brent Spiner as Adam Soong

Recurring

 John de Lancie as Q
 Madeline Wise as Yvette Picard
 Annie Wersching as the original Borg Queen
 Sol Rodríguez as Teresa Ramirez
 Ito Aghayere as young Guinan
 Penelope Mitchell as Renée Picard

Notable guests

 Whoopi Goldberg as Guinan
 April Grace as Sally Whitley
 Kirk Thatcher as the punk on the bus 
 James Callis as Maurice Picard
 Jay Karnes as Martin Wells
 Wil Wheaton as Wesley Crusher

Production

Development
Executive producer Heather Kadin revealed in October 2018 that Star Trek: Picard was intended to be an ongoing series rather than a limited miniseries; the producers knew from the time Patrick Stewart signed on to star in the series that a second season would definitely be made. Stewart reiterated this in February 2019 and added, "We are set up for possibly three years of this show". That September, Stewart said filming for a second season could begin as early as March 2020. Co-creator Alex Kurtzman confirmed a month later that a second season was "already in the works" ahead of the first-season premiere in January 2020.

In early December, co-creator and showrunner Michael Chabon signed an overall deal with CBS Television Studios to create several new series for them, beginning with an adaptation of his novel The Amazing Adventures of Kavalier & Clay. Chabon was expected to remain with Picard as showrunner until he had to shift focus to Kavalier & Clay at some point in 2020, at which point he would still be creatively involved in Picard as an executive producer. A week later, the series was informally green-lit for a second 10-episode season after being allocated $20.4million in tax credits by the California Film Commission for the production to continue filming in California. This was the most any television series had been awarded by the program since its expansion in September 2014. An official renewal from streaming service CBS All Access (later rebranded Paramount+) was expected once a showrunner for the second season could be confirmed.

In January 2020, CBS officially announced the second season renewal and revealed that Terry Matalas had joined the series as an executive producer to fill the void that would be created by Chabon's departure. CBS had moved Matalas, who began his career working on Star Trek: Voyager and Star Trek: Enterprise, from MacGyver to Picard because the latter was considered a high priority for the studio. Matalas had been working with Chabon and the second season's writers for "some time" before the official announcement, and he was expected to take over as showrunner once Chabon left the series. Picard was also reported to have an informal green-light for a third season that would be developed at the same time as the second, so the two could be filmed back-to-back. Chabon expressed regret at having to leave the series, but said he was "every bit as involved" in the second season's development as he had been on the first, and he would be writing for the second season as well as remaining an executive producer. The difference, he explained, was that he would not be running the series day-to-day once filming began.

Journalist Marc Bernardin, who began his career working as an intern on Star Trek: Deep Space Nine, joined Picard as a supervising producer in March 2020. By the end of that month, filming was set to begin in mid-June. These plans were made before the COVID-19 pandemic began. Executive producer and co-creator Akiva Goldsman said in May 2020 that if filming could not begin in June due to the pandemic, it would begin as soon as possible after pandemic restrictions were lifted. That September, after a deal was made between major studios and Hollywood unions regarding safety measures for productions during the pandemic, director Jonathan Frakes said filming could begin in January 2021 and added that Stewart was eager to begin as soon as possible; filming began in February. Goldsman and Matalas were revealed to be working together as co-showrunners for the season that April.

Writing
Following the first-season finale, Chabon and Goldsman said the second season would not ignore the fact that Picard's consciousness was transferred into a synthetic body during that finale. They added that the season would further explore the personal lives of the series' supporting cast, the first season's Romulan refugee storyline, and the technology and culture of Starfleet. Goldsman said the season would continue to explore issues that come up in the last stage of a person's life. One lesson learned by the writers during the first season, according to Goldsman, was to try figure out the ending of the season before they began filming.

The writers began by asking questions about Picard's role in the first season, such as "Why is he on a vineyard by himself with a dog? Why did he never marry Beverly Crusher and have a family?" This led to them deconstructing Picard in different ways from the first season, putting an emphasis on his past relationships, romance, and "the puzzle-pieces of his past that are stopping him from embracing his future". After joining the writers room, Matalas suggested that the second season feature the Star Trek: The Next Generation character Q because he is "one of [Picard's] first relationships", and because Matalas felt Q was "the figure you introduce when your heroes need to face their truest selves". He did caution that they wanted to tell a dramatic story with Q rather than just "the same Loki-esque shenanigans" as his previous appearances. Matalas, who is known for the time travel-based series 12 Monkeys, also suggested the time travel-focused plot for the season which was inspired by the film Star Trek IV: The Voyage Home (1986). He stated that "all good time-travel tales are emotional at their core, and speak to something that's happening with your main character", and the season explores Picard's trauma from his mother's death by suicide when Picard was a child. Stewart brought his own experience of childhood domestic violence and subsequent trauma into that storyline. Matalas praised Goldsman for developing the ideas for the season into a "really fascinating and heartbreaking psychological exploration of Picard".

The second and third seasons tell separate stories, despite being developed together. Before the end of 2019, Chabon and Goldsman met with Stewart to pitch the season's story, and Kurtzman said in January 2020 that the writers were confident in it. Kurtzman did want the option to adjust the story based on responses to the first season, but Chabon said the second season would not be affected by fans who criticized the first for not meeting their expectations. The full story for the second season was broken by March 2020 and writing had begun. The story features Q sending Picard and his companions to an alternate timeline where humanity has formed the xenophobic "Confederation of Earth" instead of the United Federation of Planets. They have to travel back in time to the 21st century to prevent that dark future from happening. Production delays due to the pandemic allowed more episodes to be written than usual, which meant earlier episodes could subsequently be revised. One change was that two episodes exploring the dark alternate timeline, written by Chabon, were re-written into one episode. Writing for the season was completed after filming began in early 2021, and Goldsman said it would not be clear if they were successful in crafting the full story until editing was done.

Casting
By June 2020, most of the main cast from the first season were expected to star in the second, including Patrick Stewart as Jean-Luc Picard, Alison Pill as Agnes Jurati, Isa Briones as Soji Asha, Evan Evagora as Elnor, Michelle Hurd as Raffi Musiker, and Santiago Cabrera as Cristobal "Chris" Rios. Harry Treadaway, who portrayed Narek in the first season, did not return for the second.

In February 2019, Whoopi Goldberg stated that she would like to reprise her Star Trek: The Next Generation role of Guinan in Picard. That July, Robert Picardo, who portrayed the holographic doctor in Star Trek: Voyager, said CBS had expressed interest in him returning for the second season of Picard. In January 2020, while promoting the first season of the series on the talk show The View, Stewart officially invited co-host Goldberg to appear in the second season, an invitation which Goldberg accepted. By April, LeVar Burton had discussed reprising his Next Generation role of Geordi La Forge on Picard, and said there was a possibility he would appear in the second season, while Gates McFadden said in June that there was a "good chance" she would be reprising her Next Generation role of Beverly Crusher in the season. In July, Picardo praised the series and expressed interest in guest-starring in it in the future, but said there were "absolutely no plans" for him to appear in the second season. In May 2021, McFadden said "things have changed a lot on different levels" and she would no longer be appearing in the second season, expressing her disappointment at this, though in April 2022 she was revealed to be reprising her role in the third season of Picard instead, alongside Burton and other members of the Next Generation cast.

After reprising his Next Generation role of Data in the first season, Brent Spiner said in March 2020 that he would not do so again as he felt that story was a fitting end to the character. He expressed interest in returning as Dr. Altan Inigo Soong, who he began playing in the first season two-part finale, and Goldsman later admitted that Altan Soong was created in part so Spiner could return following Data's death. Chabon expressed interest in first-season recurring guest stars Jeri Ryan, Orla Brady, and Jamie McShane returning for the second season, respectively as Voyagers Seven of Nine and Picard's Romulan staff-members Laris and Zhaban. He said a relationship between Seven and Raffi that was teased at the end of the first season would be explored in the second. Ryan confirmed in May 2020 that she was returning for the second season, and she, Brady, and Spiner were revealed to be main cast members in April 2021. Zhaban is revealed to have died since the end of the first season, and Laris becomes a love interest for Picard in the second. Brady also plays Tallinn, an ancestor of Laris's who is a Supervisor like the Star Trek: The Original Series character Gary Seven. Spiner's contract stipulated that he not portray Data again, and he instead plays a new Soong ancestor in 2024 named Adam. Briones portrays his daughter, Kore, which helps to explain who Data was inspired by for the appearance of Briones's Soji in the first season (Soji is Data's synthetic "daughter").

Also in April 2021, John de Lancie was announced as reprising his Next Generation role of Q, an extra-dimensional being, in the season. To explain de Lancie's older appearance, Q initially appears the same as he did in The Next Generation (with de Lancie being digitally de-aged) before choosing to age himself to match the older Picard. In September, Annie Wersching was revealed to be cast in the recurring role of the Borg Queen, taking over from Alice Krige who portrayed the character in the film Star Trek: First Contact (1996) as well as the Voyager series finale. Susanna Thompson also portrayed the character in several episodes of Voyager. Wersching's first television role was as a guest star on Star Trek: Enterprise, and Goldsman considered bringing this "full circle" by having this version of the Borg Queen be the same character. Later in the season, the Borg Queen enters the mind of Agnes Jurati and becomes a new Queen that Alison Pill portrays. The season also introduces a younger version of Guinan in 2024 who does not yet know Picard. The original version of Guinan first met Picard in 1893 during the events of the Next Generation time travel episode "Time's Arrow", but Matalas explained that these events do not happen during this season's altered timeline because the Federation does not exist. A long-time Next Generation fan, guest star Ito Aghayere revisited Goldberg's episodes and studied her mannerisms. She intended for her version to start as more aggressive and grow into Goldberg's calmer performance.

With the season delving further into Picard's family, his mother Yvette appears several times via flashbacks. The character was portrayed as an old woman by Herta Ware in the Next Generation episode "Where No One Has Gone Before", but a younger version is portrayed by Madeline Wise in this season, in which she is shown to have struggled with mental health issues and died by suicide when Picard was a child. Picard explains that he has been suppressing this memory all of his life and Ware's older version of the character was a vision that he had imagined of his mother getting to live a long life. James Callis, who had a recurring role in 12 Monkeys, appears as Picard's father Maurice (who was portrayed by Clive Church in The Next Generation). A new member of the family, Renée Picard, plays a key role in the season's 2024 events, portrayed by Penelope Mitchell.

When serving as an associate producer on Star Trek IV: The Voyage Home, Kirk Thatcher briefly appeared in the film as the "Punk on the Bus". He reprises this role for another brief appearance in the second season of Picard, which was one of the first things that Matalas pitched for the season as a way to reference the film and acknowledge its influence on the season's story. Thatcher was excited to return to the role, which he said was what he was best known for, and he had suggestions for the character's appearance including a similar red mohawk as he had in the film. April Grace, who previously portrayed Maggie Hubbell in episodes of The Next Generation and Deep Space Nine, portrays Admiral Sally Whitley in the season premiere. Jay Karnes plays FBI agent Martin Wells after previously portraying the time travelling Starfleet officer Ducane in Star Trek: Voyager. Additionally, Sol Rodríguez has a recurring role as Teresa Ramirez, a doctor who treats those without identification or money and helps Rios; Briones's father, Jon Jon Briones, portrays the Confederation Magistrate in the alternate timeline; Patton Oswalt voices a virtual cat named Spot 73; Brian "Q" Quinn makes a cameo appearance as Dale, a character that he also appeared as in Matalas's previous series 12 Monkeys and MacGyver; director Lea Thompson appears as Dr. Diane Werner, the chairman of a committee who remove Adam Soong's license to research and funding; and Stewart's wife Sunny Ozell has a cameo appearance singing in a bar that Jurati goes to. Wil Wheaton reprised his Next Generation role of Wesley Crusher for an appearance in the season finale, which he kept secret for around a year until the episode was released. Wheaton was excited to return and praised the writers for honoring the headcanon that Wheaton developed for the character after The Next Generation, in which Crusher serves as one of the Travelers who is "effectively Star Trek version of a Time Lord" from Doctor Who.

Design
Matalas said each season would be differentiated visually. He wanted to return to the visual style of the Next Generation era while incorporating elements from the Original Series-era films, which were his personal favorites. He said new production designer Dave Blass was a long-time Star Trek fan who also wanted to return to that aesthetic, and they both insisted on bringing back several creatives from earlier Star Trek series including Michael and Denise Okuda, who designed the LCARS computer system for The Next Generation; long-time Star Trek concept designer and visual effects artists Doug Drexler; and frequent Star Trek starship designer John Eaves. The design team included a lot of references to previous Star Trek projects, which Matalas said was partially "cheeky, nerdy fun", but also about honoring the history and legacy of the franchise. The series' opening title sequence was updated from the first season by creative agency Prologue to include new imagery from the second season, including adding a Starfleet combadge to Picard's jacket for the ending shot.

The Starfleet uniform designs from the first season were merged with those from the Original Series-era films; one of Leonard Nimoy's Spock costumes from Star Trek II: The Wrath of Khan (1982) was used as reference. The new designs have a jacket-like opening and remove the "militaristic collar" from the first season's uniforms. They are black with different colors across the chest and shoulders to represent each division. Picard's Starfleet Academy assignment badge was inspired by the badge worn by William Shatner's Admiral James T. Kirk in The Wrath of Khan. The Borg Queen was intended to be a new character with access to the same information as the previous Queens, and Matalas wanted a new design that honered the previous Borg Queen designs while "bringing it into the 4K streaming world". Creature designer Neville Page created the new design which was translated into prosthetics by Glenn Hetrick and Alchemy Studio. Head of prosthetics James Mackinnon applied the prosthetics to Wersching, which initially took four hours but was down to two-and-a-half hours by the end of production. The prosthetics consisted of a crown piece that Page sculpted digitally, based on scans of Wersching's head, which was 3D printed and had built-in lighting. 10 other silicon pieces were used to cover Wersching's face, neck, and shoulders, featuring built-in magnets where the Queen needed to be connected to her containment vessel. Page wanted to match the original Borg Queen silhouette of just a head and neck, but ultimately gave the character shoulders and arms due to logistical concerns. He approached the character as an evolution of the prosthetics that were already used for Seven of Nine, who has Borg implants.

The design team wanted to expand Chateau Picard beyond the main study set from the first season, introducing a library and a solarium. Art director Joe Comeau described the chateau as a "reflection of the psyche" of Picard. It is seen in three different time periods in the season: 2401 at the beginning of the season, abandoned in 2024 for much of the season, and in flashbacks to 2315 when young Picard and his family first move in. Matalas and the designers wanted to bridge the look of the chateau from the first season with its depiction in the Next Generation episode "Family". Establishing shots of the chateau in 2024 include two wings of the building that are not seen in the first season or the second season's 2401 scenes. These match the parts of the building seen in "Family", suggesting that they burned down during the fire that is mentioned in the film Star Trek Generations (1994). Evidence of fire damage was included in the 2401 solarium design, and the 2315 sets were meant to align with the style of "Family"'s sets rather than the "tuscan look" of the first season and the second season's 2401 sets. The designers intended to have major damage, like a "busted ceiling", in the 2024 sets but this was cut back in favor of general aging and set dressing.

The season introduces a new starship, the USS Stargazer (NCC-82893). Designed by Eaves, Drexler, and Blass, it was based on an earlier USS Stargazer (NCC-2893), the first starship that Picard captained which was introduced in the Next Generation episode "The Battle". The new ship retains the original Stargazer unique design of having four nacelles. Goldsman said they wanted to revisit the Stargazer, which Picard has a deep emotional connection to, as part of the season's theme of looking back at the past. Blass explained that the registry for the new version was not "NCC-2893-A", following the pattern used for the USS Enterprise of denoting the version with a letter, because the Stargazer "does not hold the status in the Federation that the Enterprise had... the Stargazer didn't have that legacy". The set for the Stargazer bridge is  wider than the bridge set for the USS Enterprise-E in the Next Generation-era films to allow for multiple widescreen cameras to film inside the set at once, though it is not as wide as the bridge set of the USS Discovery from Star Trek: Discovery.

Filming
Filming was scheduled to begin in mid-June 2020, but was delayed to January 2021 by the COVID-19 pandemic. In December 2020, Ryan said filming would begin on February 1, but on that date she revealed that it was delayed again. Principal photography began on February 16, in California where the series received tax incentives to continue filming after the first season. Doug Aarniokoski directed the first two episodes, and Crescenzo Notarile served as cinematographer after doing so for the third season of Discovery. Jimmy Lindsey was also a cinematographer for the season. Location filming took place later in February at the Walt Disney Concert Hall in Los Angeles, to portray Starfleet Academy in the first episode and the Confederation Presidential Palace in the second. SoFi Stadium in Inglewood was also used to depict part of Starfleet Academy in the premiere. In April, de Lancie said scenes for the second and third seasons of Picard were being filmed simultaneously. Matalas and Goldsman both worked on the second season until around halfway through filming, when Matalas switched focus to the third season and Goldsman continued running the second. The two seasons had one of the largest television series crews at the time with more than 450 crewmembers.

Lea Thompson directed the third and fourth episodes, including the sequence where the main cast travel back in time to 2024. This was not initially in the third episode's script when Thompson joined the series, but it was moved from the second episode to the third following rewrites. Thompson noted that she has experience working with time travel stories after starring in the Back to the Future film trilogy, and also acknowledged that there were existing time travel sequences in Star Trek that they wanted to be consistent with. The crew still wanted to put their "own spin on what it would look like going back in time", and specific visuals that Thompson added to the sequence include falling sparks that suddenly rise back off the ground, a tear on Jurati's cheek moving in reverse, and footage captured by moving a camera dolly forward while zooming out which was a technique popularized by Alfred Hitchcock. Thompson spent a lot of time discussing how to light the set of La Sirena with Notarile due to its large size and the complex lighting needed for the time travel sequence, including flashing lights, sparks, strobes, and a representation of the ship flying close to the sun. They also had to light the set with the Borg Queen's "signature green hue" for the scene where Picard and Jurati attempt to extract information from the Borg Queen. The Markridge Industrial Tower that Raffi and Seven visit in the third episode was filmed at the Wilshire Grand Center, the tallest building in Los Angeles. The name "Markridge" is a reference to 12 Monkeys. While at the tower, Raffi detects an alien signal coming from MacArthur Park, which is where Picard's meeting with Tallinn in the fourth episode was filmed.

Frequent Star Trek director Jonathan Frakes helmed the fifth and sixth episodes. Filming for them began by the end of June 2021. Frakes discussed the change in tone between the first and second seasons with Matalas and Goldsman, but not any changes to his own directing style. He noted that there were several parallels between the episodes and the film Star Trek: First Contact, which he directed, and he worked with Lindsey to replicate some of the techniques that cinematographer Matthew F. Leonetti used on the film. Frakes also acknowledged the similar approach in portraying 2024 to the Deep Space Nine two-part episode "Past Tense", which he directed half of. Frakes explained that both depictions had "a lot to do with immigration and the mistreatment of brown people... being set in 2024 serves as a cautionary tale to all of us." He felt this element of the season helped make it feel like Star Trek despite the contemporary setting. Frakes was excited to be working with Stewart, Spiner, and de Lancie again after he starred with them on Next Generation, particularly highlighting the scene where Soong and Q meet in a diner. He praised Spiner and de Lancie as having "gotten better with age. There is a real confidence in the way they embrace their characters." For the scene where Q pretends to be Renée Picard's therapist, Frakes and de Lancie decided on set that the latter should use a Sigmund Freud-inspired Austrian accent. Frakes acknowledged that this was "a little on the nose" and something that Matalas and Goldsman had questioned, but they felt it was fun for the scene. The interior of the gala in these episodes was primarily filmed at the Millennium Biltmore Hotel in Downtown Los Angeles. Exteriors for the gala were filmed at the Fox Theater in Westwood Village.

Joe Menendez directed the seventh and eighth episodes, after previously working with Matalas on 12 Monkeys. Michael Weaver directed the ninth and tenth episodes. The use of smoke on set during the filming of the last two episodes affected Stewart's vocal cords, making his voice more hoarse than usual. The producers planned to re-record his dialogue for the episodes, but Stewart encouraged them not to do that because "the weakness in [his] voice was reflecting the weakness in the character". Filming for the season ended on September 2, 2021, and the production segued fully into filming the third season.

Visual effects
Visual effects vendors for the season included Crafty Apes VFX, Outpost VFX, and Gradient Effects. Outpost was initially just hired to work on the La Sirena crash and Chateau Picard location in the third episode, but their work was expanded to include four other episodes in the season when the producers liked the results. Shots featuring Chateau Picard used aerial footage of the chateau filming location which needed to be augmented to make it look rundown for the 2024 scenes and "pristine" for the 25th century scenes. The La Sirena crash required fire and spark effects on the ship as well as simulations of its impact on the chateau grounds.

For the fleet of starships that appear in the season premiere, Blass wanted to address fan criticisms regarding the fleet from the first-season finale in which all of the ships looked very similar. Though he knew this was done due to practical limitations in modelling that many different ships, Blass looked for a viable solution for this season and contacted the creators of the Star Trek Online video game about using some of their starship models. He specifically wanted to use the most popular ships from the game, as long as none of them had four nacelles so the Stargazer could stand out beside them. Star Trek Online designer and associate art director Thomas Marrone and his team provided their digital models of existing Next Generation-era ships (including the Akira-class from Star Trek: First Contact), their own original models of potential 25th-century ships, and some new models created specifically for the season. Marrone updated the models with more detail to match the higher quality expected for a television series, and the Picard visual effects team used these models in the final sequence. This meant that fan-favorite starships from the game were now franchise canon (including the Ross-class exploration cruiser and the Reliant-class light cruiser) which Marrone said was a "dream come true".

The user interfaces for the starships were created by visual effects company Twisted Media, based on the LCARS computer system. They referenced the designs from The Next Generation and the films of that era, as well as the Star Trek: The Next Generation Technical Manual (1991) reference guide by Rick Sternbach and Michael Okuda. Okuda consulted on the company's LCARS designs, as did Drexler who also provided digital models that were integrated into the interface screens. The original plan was to mostly add the user interfaces during post-production, but this changed after Todd A. Marks and his video playback company Images on Screen joined the series. They used a combination of LG OLED screens and Screen Innovations' FlexGlass projection screens (paired with rear screen projectors) to display the interfaces on set during filming for the first and last episodes.

Music
Composer Jeff Russo said in December 2020 that he was beginning to think about the score for the season, which features an "up-tempo rearrangement" of the series' main theme. Russo did this because he wanted "a little more pace and a little more hype" to reflect the swashbuckling, action-heavy tone of the second season compared to the more contemplative first season that he originally wrote the theme for. After referencing Jerry Goldsmith's theme from The Next Generation and Alexander Courage's original Star Trek theme in his initial music for the series, Russo also references Goldsmith's First Contact theme in the second season's score.

In Thatcher's first appearance as the punk on the bus in The Voyage Home, the character listens to a punk rock song titled "I Hate You" that Thatcher wrote and performed with members of the film's crew. For this season, Thatcher wrote and performed a new song for the character to listen to titled "I Still Hate You". The Voyage Home sound editors Mark Mangini and Aaron Glascock returned to record the new song, respectively performing guitar and drums. For Ozell's cameo appearance, she and her band perform the song "Take You Down" from her album Overnight Lows. Menendez chose the song, which Ozell called a "strong, sassy, bluesy powerful anthem".

Russo had begun recording the season's score with an orchestra at the Sony Pictures Scoring Stage by December 2021, and completed recording for the season finale on January 12, 2022. A soundtrack album was released digitally by Lakeshore Records on April 29, 2022, featuring Russo's score along with Alison Pill's version of "Shadows of the Night" from the episode "Two of One". All music by Jeff Russo, except where noted:

Marketing
CBS announced in June 2020 that it was participating in the "All In Challenge" to raise money for COVID-19 relief. Money donated to the campaign would go to charities including Feeding America, Meals on Wheels, World Central Kitchen, and No Kid Hungry, and fans who donated could win the chance to visit the series' set, meet Patrick Stewart, and have a walk-on role in an episode. In February 2021, Stewart appeared in a marketing campaign for Super Bowl LV advertising the rebranded streaming service Paramount+. A panel for the season was held during the "First Contact Day" virtual event on April 5, 2021, celebrating the franchise on the fictional holiday marking first contact between humans and aliens in the Star Trek universe. Stewart and de Lancie discussed the season at the panel, which debuted a teaser revealing the focus on time travel and the return of Q. A second teaser was released to coincide with "Capitan Picard Day" on June 16, featuring a look at de Lancie's return and teasing an alternate timeline for the characters. A teaser poster was also released featuring a contemporary-looking Los Angeles. Liz Shannon Miller of Collider highlighted the appearance of Q in the trailer as well as the emphasis on other characters such as Seven of Nine in alternate timeline scenarios. Matthew Jackson at Syfy Wire also highlighted the appearance of Q, saying it gave him goosebumps. James Whitbrook of io9 focused on Seven of Nine appearing without her Borg implants and described the teaser poster as "cryptic".

The "Star Trek Day" virtual event on September 8, celebrating the 55th anniversary of the Star Trek: The Original Series premiere, included a panel for the season where a new trailer was revealed. io9 Germain Lussier felt it answered some questions about the season's plot, which he compared to Back to the Future Part II (1989), but also raised more questions. He noted that the time travelling plot allowed the season to film in modern-day Los Angeles in a similar way to Star Trek IV: The Voyage Home. Joshua Meyer of /Film highlighted the reveal of the Borg Queen as well as the apparent social commentary of the trailer, including where it juxtaposes a "Nuremberg-esque rally" with images of Hong Kong in an apparent reference to the 2019–2020 Hong Kong protests. He saw this as evidence of Picard being the most overt of the current Star Trek series in its attempts at social commentary, bringing it more in-line with past Star Trek series. Meyer also compared the trailer's totalitarian imagery to similar scenes in Star Wars: The Force Awakens (2015). The official trailer and key art for the season were released in January 2022 after the premiere date was revealed. Commentators said the trailer covered many of the same concepts as the previous teasers, including Q and time travel, but it also gave the first look at Goldberg's return in the season which was the highlight for many. Adam Holmes of CinemaBlend, who believed Guinan was the most important recurring character on The Next Generation, said the trailer "finally gives us our first taste" of Goldberg's role after she publicly agreed to return. He speculated on how the season would explain the fact that Goldberg has aged since she last portrayed Guinan despite her scenes seemingly being set in the past.

Coinciding with the season's release, Paramount+ opened the 10 Forward: The Experience pop-up event in Los Angeles on March 10, for 10 days. Each day featured a different local food truck as well as themed cocktails and the "10 Forward Canteen Store" where merchandise could be purchased. The event also featured "experiential environments", "digital interactions", and photo opportunities. Guests were encouraged to dress in cosplay. Paramount+ also brought the 10 Forward: The Experience pop-up event to San Diego from July 21 to 24 for the 2022 San Diego Comic-Con. July 23 featured a surprise event with members of the cast. At the Las Vegas Star Trek convention in August, Star Trek Wines announced the 2401 Chateau Picard wine and a Risian wine based on those seen in "The Star Gazer". The bottles were based on scans of the props from the episode.

Release

Streaming and broadcast
The season premiered on March 3, 2022, on Paramount+ in the United States, and ran for 10 episodes until May 5. Each episode was broadcast in Canada by Bell Media on the same day as the U.S., on the specialty channels CTV Sci-Fi Channel (English) and Z (French) before streaming on Crave. Amazon Prime Video streamed the episodes within 24 hours of their U.S. release in over 200 other countries and territories. In February 2023, Paramount made a new deal with Prime Video for the series' international streaming rights. This allowed the season to be added to Paramount+ in some other countries in addition to remaining on Prime Video.

Home media
The season was released on DVD, Blu-Ray, and Limited Edition Steelbook formats in the U.S. on October 4, 2022. The release includes all 10 episodes, as well as deleted scenes, a gag reel, and behind-the-scenes featurettes on the creation and design of the USS Stargazer, the making of the Chateau Picard sets, the season's props, Q's storyline with de Lancie, and the season's new prosthetics for the Borg Queen.

Reception

Viewership
Whip Media, who track viewership data for the 19 million worldwide users of their TV Time app, ranked Picard in the top 10 original streaming series for U.S. viewership each week the season was released except for the week of the season premiere. Parrot Analytics determines audience "demand expressions" based on various data sources, and the company calculated that Picard was the third-most in demand U.S. streaming series for March 2022 behind Disney+'s The Mandalorian and Netflix's Stranger Things. This was the first time a Paramount+ series appeared in the company's monthly rankings in nine months, and they said the series was 32 times more in demand than the average U.S. streaming series. It dropped slightly to 31.4 times more in demand for April 2022, though this made it the sixth-most in demand series on Parrot's list after several new series were released. Picard was the ninth-most in demand series for May 2022, according to Parrot, down to 27.4 times more in demand than the average series. This was behind Star Trek: Strange New Worlds, which debuted at fifth place.

Critical response

The review aggregator website Rotten Tomatoes reported an 85% approval score with an average rating of 7.95/10 based on 94 reviews. The website's critical consensus reads, "Picard gets some backup from franchise fan favorites in a sophomore season that charts a course towards recapturing more of the classical Star Trek spirit and makes it so." Metacritic, which uses a weighted average, assigned a score of 69 out of 100 based on reviews from 7 critics, indicating "generally favorable reviews".

IGN gave the season a negative review saying, it "might just be the worst season of Star Trek ever produced." The review also stated that although the season "started off in a good place, looking to amend some of the missteps of the show's freshman year... in attempting to embrace and celebrate the things that fans love about Star Trek, the show fell into the trap of regurgitating old concepts."

Accolades

References

External links
 
 

2022 American television seasons
Season 2
Picard 02
Television productions postponed due to the COVID-19 pandemic
Television shows set in Los Angeles
Time travel in Star Trek